Dufner is a surname. Notable people with the surname include:

Delores Dufner (born 1939), American sacred music composer, librettist, and organist
Edward Dufner (1872–1957), American painter
Jason Dufner (born 1977), American professional golfer

See also
Dubner
Küfner